Ildar Pomykalov is a Paralympian athlete from Russia competing mainly in category T12 long-distance events.

Career 
He competed in the 1996 Summer Paralympics in Atlanta, United States.  There he won a bronze medal in the men's 5000 metres - T12 event, finished fourth in the men's 10000 metres - T12 event and finished seventh in the men's Marathon - T12 event.  He also competed at the 2000 Summer Paralympics in Sydney, Australia.    There he won a gold medal in the men's Marathon - T13 event.  He also competed at the 2004 Summer Paralympics in Athens, Greece.    There he won a gold medal in the men's Marathon - T13 event and finished sixth in the men's 10000 metres - T13 event.  He also competed at the 2008 Summer Paralympics in Beijing, China.    There he won a bronze medal in the men's Marathon - T12 event.

External links 
 

Paralympic athletes of Russia
Athletes (track and field) at the 1996 Summer Paralympics
Athletes (track and field) at the 2000 Summer Paralympics
Athletes (track and field) at the 2004 Summer Paralympics
Athletes (track and field) at the 2008 Summer Paralympics
Paralympic gold medalists for Russia
Paralympic bronze medalists for Russia
Year of birth missing (living people)
Living people
Medalists at the 1996 Summer Paralympics
Medalists at the 2000 Summer Paralympics
Medalists at the 2004 Summer Paralympics
Medalists at the 2008 Summer Paralympics
Paralympic medalists in athletics (track and field)
Russian male long-distance runners
Russian male marathon runners
Visually impaired long-distance runners
Visually impaired marathon runners
Paralympic long-distance runners
Paralympic marathon runners